Erbessa seducta is a moth of the family Notodontidae first described by Louis Beethoven Prout in 1918. It is found in Venezuela.

The length of the forewings is 15–16 mm.

References

Moths described in 1918
Notodontidae of South America